Montreal v Montreal Locomotive Works Ltd [1944] UKPC 44 is a Privy Council case relating to tax and commercial business, but of interest to Canadian and UK labour law on the definition for employees.

Facts
The City of Montreal claimed taxes from Montreal Locomotive Works Ltd, which built a plant to manufacture tanks and gun carriages for the Minister of Munitions and Supply of Canada, "for and on behalf of the Government and as its agent". If the company was occupying the premises where it built the plant merely as an agent, then it would not be liable for tax, but if it was carrying on business on its own behalf it could, under the British North America Act section 125.

The Supreme Court of Canada held that the company was merely an agent.

Advice
The Privy Council advised that the company was not liable for tax, and had to be regarded as an agent. Lord Wright delivered the advice, and said the following.

See also

UK labour law

Notes

References

United Kingdom labour case law